The 1946 United States Air Force C-47 crash, known in China as the April 8 Incident, was the crash of US Army Air Force C-47B-1-DL (registration 43–16360) from Chongqing to Yan'an that struck a mountain in Shaanxi, China, killing all four crew members and 13 passengers, including several top Communist Chinese leaders.

Background
Following the end of World War II, the Kuomintang government of China and the Chinese Communist Party (CCP) commenced negotiations for a political settlement to form a joint government. During WWII, the US Air Force set up operations at Chongqing, including the Flying Tigers units that fought Japanese forces in China. The US military remained in Chongqing after the end of the war, and US government agents were instrumental in organizing negotiations between the Kuomintang and CCP. In order to facilitate these negotiations, the US Air Force flew CCP representatives between the Communist headquarters at Yan'an in Shaanxi province to Chongqing.

Accident
The C-47 was stationed at Peishiyi Airfield near Chongqing. Sergeant Dallas Wise, a twenty-year-old member of the United States Fourteenth Air Force, stationed out of Chongqing, served as first officer and radio operator. The C-47 flight that took off from Chongqing en route to Yan'an had thirteen passengers - all members of the CCP delegation at Chongqing - and the four US military personnel who operated the flight. Among those on the flight were notable Communist Party leaders, including General Ye Ting; General Secretary of the Chinese Communist Party Qin Bangxian, also known as Bo Gu; former-President of the Central Party School Deng Fa; and Communist Party Central Committee Member Wang Ruofei. Accompanying Ye Ting on the flight were his wife, daughter, son and nanny. According to Wise's father, the aircrafted landed at Xi'an to refuel before ascending once more to fly to Yan'an.
 
The crash forced the CCP to reorganize their negotiating delegation, becoming known, in China, as the "April 8 Incident."

References

Accidents and incidents involving United States Air Force aircraft
Accidents and incidents involving the Douglas C-47 Skytrain
Aviation accidents and incidents in China
History of the Chinese Communist Party
Aviation accidents and incidents in 1946
1946 in China
China–United States relations